Robert Woodruff may refer to:

 Robert Woodruff (director) (born 1947), theatre director
 Robert A. Woodruff (born 1943), American physicist
 Robert Eastman Woodruff (1884–1957), president of Erie Railroad, 1939–1949
 Robert S. Woodruff, coach at Wheaton College in Illinois
 Robert W. Woodruff (1889–1985), philanthropist and long-time president of The Coca-Cola Company
 Bob Woodruff (born 1961), television journalist wounded in Iraq in 2006
 Bob Woodruff (American football) (1916–2001), University of Florida and Baylor University head football coach
 Bob Woodruff (singer) (born 1961), American country music singer and songwriter
 Bobby Woodruff (born 1940), English former footballer

See also
 Robert Woodruff Anderson, American playwright